Richard Grossinger (born Richard Towers) (born 1944) is an American writer and founder of North Atlantic Books in Berkeley, California.

Biography
Grossinger was born and raised in New York City, attended Horace Mann School, Amherst College, and the University of Michigan, earning a B.A. in English at Amherst and a Ph.D. in anthropology at Michigan. With his wife (then girlfriend at Smith College) Lindy Hough, he founded the journal Io in 1964, then founded North Atlantic Books in Vermont in 1974. Between 1970 and 1972 he taught anthropology at the University of Maine, Portland-Gorham, now the University of Southern Maine, and between 1972 and 1977 he taught interdisciplinary studies (including alchemy, Melville, Classical Greek, Jungian psychology, and ethnoastronomy) at Goddard College in Plainfield, Vermont. An ethnographer and self-described psychospiritual explorer as well as a writer and publisher, he has "studied" or "trained" in homeopathic medicine, somatic theory,  t'ai chi ch'uan, craniosacral therapy, qigong, Breema, yoga, and something called "psychic healing".

His brother was Jonathan Towers, a poet who committed suicide in 2005. His daughter is filmmaker, author and performance artist Miranda July.

Bibliography

Books written by Grossinger

Solar Journal (Oecological Sections) (1970) Black Sparrow Press 
Spaces Wild & Tame (1971) Mudra 
The Book of the Earth and Sky  (1971, 2 Vols) Black Sparrow Press 
Mars: A Science Fiction Vision (1972) Io Books [No ISBN]
Two Essays (Sparrow 7)  (1973) Black Sparrow Press [No ISBN]
The Continents (1973) Black Sparrow Press 
The Book of Being Born Again into the World (1974) North Atlantic Books 
Book of the Cranberry Islands (1974) Black Sparrow Press 
The Windy Passage from Nostalgia (1974) North Atlantic Books 
The Long Body of the Dream (1974) North Atlantic Books 
Martian Homecoming at the All-American Revival Church (1974) North Atlantic Books 
The Slag of Creation (1975) North Atlantic Books 
The Provinces (1975) North Atlantic books 
Unfinished Business of Doctor Hermes (1976) North Atlantic Books 
Planet Medicine: From Stone-Age Shamanism to Post-Industrial Healing (1980/1990) North Atlantic Books 
The Night Sky: The Science and Anthropology of the Stars and Planets (1981/1988/1992) North Atlantic Books  
Nuclear Strategy and the Code of the Warrior (1984) North Atlantic Books 
Embryogenesis: Species, Gender and Identity (1985/2000) North Atlantic Books 
Waiting for the Martian Express: Cosmic Visitors, Earth Warriors, Luminous Dreams (1989) North Atlantic Books 
Homeopathy: An Introduction for Skeptics and Beginners (1993) North Atlantic Books 
Planet Medicine: Modalities (1995/2003) North Atlantic books 
New Moon (1996) Frog Ltd 
Out of Babylon: Ghosts of Grossinger's (1997) Frog Ltd 
Homeopathy: The Great Riddle (1998) North Atlantic Books 
Embryos, Galaxies, and Sentient Beings: How the Universe Makes Life(2003) North Atlantic Books 
On the Integration of Nature: Post 9-11 Biopolitical Notes (2005) North Atlantic Books 
Migraine Auras: When the Visual World Fails (2006) North Atlantic Books 
The New York Mets: Myth, Ethnography, Subtext (2007) Frog Ltd 
The Bardo of Waking Life (2008) North Atlantic Books 
2013: Raising the Earth to the Next Vibration (2010) North Atlantic Books 9781556438783

Works edited by Grossinger

The Alchemical Tradition in the Late Twentieth Century (1970)
Baseball Diamonds: Tales, Traces, Visions & Voodoo from a Native American Rite (1980 with Kevin Kerrane)
Planetary Mysteries: Megaliths, Glaciers, The Face on Mars, and Aboriginal Dreams (1986, Revised 1993)
The Dreamlife of Johnny Baseball (1987 with works by Tom Clark, Jerome Klinkowitz, Grossinger, W.P. Kinsella, Richard Russo, Nancy Willard)
Into the Temple of Baseball (1990/2000 with Kevin Kerrane)

Select Io Journal editions

#4: Alchemy Issue. 1967.
#5: Doctrine of Signatures. 1968.
#6: Ethnoastronomy Issue. 1969.
#8: Dreams Issue on Oneirology. 1971.
#9: Mars: A Science Fiction Vision. 1971.
#10: Baseball Issue. 1971.
#12: Earth Geography Booklet No. 1. 1972.
#13: Earth Geography Booklet No. 2. 1972.
#14: Earth Geography Booklet No. 3. 1973.
#15: Earth Geography Booklet No. 4. 1973.
#18: Early Field Notes From the All-American Revival Church. 1973.
#19: Mind/Memory/Psyche. 1974.
#20: Biopoesis. 1974.
#21 'Vermont: Geology and Mineral Industries, Flora, Fauna & Conditions of Sky (1974)
#22: An Olson-Melville Sourcebook, Vol. 1: The New Found Land/North America. 1976.
#23: An Olson-Melville Sourcebook, Volume 2: The Mediterranean. 1976.
#24: Baseball, I Gave You All the Best Years of My Life (1977 with Kevin Kerrane; 1992 with Lisa Conrad)
#25: Ecology and Consciousness: Traditional Wisdom on the Environment. 1978.
#26: Alchemy: Pre-Egyptian Legacy, Millennial Promise 1979.
#31: Alchemical Tradition in the Late Twentieth Century. 1983/1991.
#34: The Temple of Baseball. 1985.
#37: Planetary Mysteries 1986.
#46: Nuclear Strategy and the Code of the Warrior (with Lindy Hough). 1992

References

External links
richardgrossinger.com
North Atlantic Books

1944 births
Living people
American male non-fiction writers
American spiritual writers
Jewish American writers
New Age writers
Horace Mann School alumni
Amherst College alumni
University of Michigan alumni
University of Maine faculty
21st-century American Jews